The Master Key may refer to:

Literature
 The Master Key (Baum novel), a children's book by L. Frank Baum
 The Master Key, a 1914 personal development book by L. W. de Laurence
 The Master Key (Togawa novel), a 1962 mystery by Masako Togawa
 The Master Key System, a personal development book by Charles F. Haanel

Film
 The Master Key (1914 serial), by Universal Studios
 The Master Key (1945 serial), by Universal Studios
 The Master Key (2009 film), a Canadian fantasy/mystery film

See also
 Master key (disambiguation)